This list contains the mobile country codes and mobile network codes for networks with country codes between 400 and 499, inclusively – a region that covers Asia and the Middle East. However, the Asian parts of the Russian Federation and Turkey are included in Mobile Network Codes in ITU region 2xx (Europe), while Maritime South East Asia and Thailand are listed under Mobile Network Codes in ITU region 5xx (Oceania).

National operators

A

Afghanistan – AF

Azerbaijan – AZ

B

Bahrain – BH

Bangladesh – BD

Bhutan – BT

C

Cambodia – KH

China – CN

H

Hong Kong – HK

I

India – IN

Iran – IR

Iraq – IQ

Israel – IL

J

Japan – JP

Jordan – JO

K

Kazakhstan – KZ

North Korea – KP

South Korea – KR

Kuwait – KW

Kyrgyzstan – KG

L

Laos – LA

Lebanon – LB

M

Macau (People's Republic of China) – MO

Maldives – MV

Mongolia – MN

Myanmar – MM

N

Nepal – NP

O

Oman – OM

P

Pakistan – PK

Palestine – PS 
(Uses the MCC of Israel)

Q

Qatar – QA

S

Saudi Arabia – SA

Sri Lanka – LK

Syria – SY

T

Taiwan – TW

Tajikistan – TJ

Turkmenistan – TM

U

United Arab Emirates – AE

Uzbekistan – UZ

V

Vietnam – VN

Y

Yemen – YE

See also
 List of mobile network operators of the Asia Pacific region
 List of LTE networks in Asia

References

Telecommunications lists
Asia-related lists